Gerald of Mayo (died 13 March 732 AD) is a saint of the Roman Catholic Church and Eastern Orthodox Church. Born in Northumbria, the son of an Anglo-Saxon king, he was one of the English monks at Lindisfarne who accompanied 
Colmán of Lindisfarne to Iona and then to Ireland. This occurred after the Synod of Whitby 664AD which decided against the Irish method of calculating the date for Easter. Colman was an ardent supporter of the Irish traditions; after the synod decided to adopt the Roman computation.

Colman and thirty English monks, St. Gerald among them, left Lindisfarne and eventually settled on Inishbofin off the coast of what is now County Mayo in 668. Dissensions arose, after a time, between the Irish and the English monks. The English were disgruntled by the behaviour of the native monks, who would leave Inishboffin to preach around the rest of the country for the duration of the summer while the English monks were left to tend to the island. Colman decided to found a separate monastery for the thirty English brethren. Thus arose the Mayo (Magh Eo, the yew plain), known as "Mayo of the Saxons", with St. Gerald as the first abbot, in 670.

The monastery became an important and flourishing institution. The School of Mayo gained greatly in fame for sanctity and learning under the youthful abbot. 
Although St. Gerald was a comparatively young man, he proved a wise ruler, and governed May until 697, when, it is said, he resigned in favour of St. Adamnan. Some authors hold that St. Adamnan celebrated the Roman Easter at Mayo, in 703, and then went to Skreen, in Hy Fiachrach, and that after his departure the monks prevailed on St. Gerald to resume the abbacy. 

St. Gerald is reputed to have founded the abbeys of Tempul-Gerald in Connaught and Teagh-na-Saxon and a convent which he placed under the care of his sister. His brother Balin also a disciple of Colman, took up residence in Connaught.

Gerald continued to govern the Abbey and Diocese of Mayo till his death at an advanced age. Colgan thinks, Gerald did not live after 697; but the Four Masters give the date of his death as 13 March 726, and the "Annals of Ulster" put the event as late as 731.

St Gerald's College, Castlebar is named for Gerald. Taoiseach Enda Kenny is an alumnus.

References

Sources 
Saint of the Day, March 13 at SaintPatrickDC.org

731 deaths
8th-century Irish abbots
Christian clergy from County Mayo
8th-century Irish bishops
8th-century Christian saints
8th-century English people
Northumbrian saints
Medieval saints of Connacht
Year of birth unknown